John Romero (born October 3, 1976) is a former American football center and offensive guard. He played college football for California before being selected by the Philadelphia Eagles in the sixth round of the 2000 NFL Draft.

Professional career
Romero was drafted by the Philadelphia Eagles in the sixth round of the 2000 NFL Draft with the 192nd overall pick, seven spots ahead of the New England Patriots' pick of quarterback Tom Brady. The 192nd pick was originally sent to the Eagles from the Washington Redskins in exchange for Rodney Peete on April 28, 1999.  In July 2000, Romero signed a three-year contract with the Eagles for $875,000 with a $50,000 signing bonus.  After originally making the Eagles' final 53-man roster, he was waived the next day to make room for center Hank Fraley, whom the Eagles claimed off waivers from the Pittsburgh Steelers.  Romero spent the entire 2000 season on the Eagles' practice squad.  He was re-signed to a two-year contract on February 6, 2001, before tearing a pectoral muscle in May 2001. He returned to training camp practice on August 16, but was waived by the team on August 25. Romero tried out for the Cincinnati Bengals and Buffalo Bills on October 3, 2001, and the Bills signed him to their practice squad the same day, where he spent the rest of the 2001 season.  The New Orleans Saints signed Romero to a futures contract on January 17, 2002, but waived him before training camp on July 16, 2002.  Romero was signed by the St. Louis Rams on August 3, 2003, and stayed with the team for a few weeks before he was waived during final roster cuts on August 25. After being out of football in 2004, he played for the Everett Hawks of the National Indoor Football League (NIFL) in 2005.

After his playing career ended, Romero became a police officer in Oakland, California.

References

External links
 California Golden Bears football bio

Living people
1976 births
American football centers
American football offensive guards
California Golden Bears football players
Philadelphia Eagles players
Buffalo Bills players
New Orleans Saints players
St. Louis Rams players